This is a list of mosques in Jordan.

See also
 Islam in Jordan
 Lists of mosques

References

External links

 
Jordan
Mosques